Joseph Pennucci is an American college baseball coach and former catcher. He is the head baseball coach at East Tennessee State University. Pennucci played college baseball at Garden City Community College and Dana College.

Playing career
Pennucci attended Loveland High School in Loveland, Colorado. Pennucci played for the school's varsity baseball team for three years. Pennucci then enrolled at Garden City Community College, to play college baseball for the Broncbusters team. After a season at Garden City, Pennucci transferred to Dana College to finish his career. He was named All-Conference one time.

Coaching career
Pennucci was named an assistant coach at Loveland High School while he was finishing up his degree at the University of Northern Colorado. Loveland won a state title during his tenure as an assistant.

In 2005, Pennucci took an assistant coaching position with Dominican College. He spent two seasons there as the associate head coach and recruiting coordinator.

In the fall of 2006, Pennucci was named an assistant coach for the Stony Brook Seawolves baseball program.

Pennucci help the Seawolves to the 2012 College World Series. Coming off the World Series run, Pennucci was promoted to associate head coach of the Seawolves.

On July 10, 2017, Pennucci was named the head coach at East Tennessee State University.

Head coaching record

See also
 List of current NCAA Division I baseball coaches

References

External links
Stony Brook Seawolves bio
East Tennessee State Buccaneers bio

Living people
Baseball catchers
Garden City Broncbusters baseball players
Dana Vikings baseball players
High school baseball coaches in the United States
Dominican Chargers baseball coaches
Stony Brook Seawolves baseball coaches
East Tennessee State Buccaneers baseball coaches
Year of birth missing (living people)
Baseball coaches from Colorado
Stony Brook University alumni
University of Northern Colorado alumni